Helena Balatková (born Šikolová, 25 March 1949 in Jablonec nad Nisou,
 ) is a former Czechoslovak cross-country skier who competed during the 1970s. She won a bronze medal in the 5 km event at the 1972 Winter Olympics in Sapporo, becoming the first Czech of either sex to win an Olympic medal in cross-country skiing.

Šikolová also finished fourth in the 10 km event at the 1970 FIS Nordic World Ski Championships.

She is mother of Helena Erbenová and mother-in-law of Lukáš Bauer.

Cross-country skiing results
All results are sourced from the International Ski Federation (FIS).

Olympic Games
 1 medal – (1 bronze)

World Championships

References

External links
 
 

Czech female cross-country skiers
Czechoslovak female cross-country skiers
Cross-country skiers at the 1972 Winter Olympics
Olympic bronze medalists for Czechoslovakia
Living people
1949 births
Olympic medalists in cross-country skiing
Medalists at the 1972 Winter Olympics
Sportspeople from Jablonec nad Nisou